In the United States Army, tabs are cloth and/or metal arches displaying a word or words signifying a special skill that are worn on U.S. Army uniforms. On the Army Combat Uniform and Army Service Uniform, the tabs are worn above a unit's Shoulder Sleeve Insignia (SSI) and are used to identify a unit's or a soldier's special skill(s) or are worn as part of a unit's SSI as part of its unique heritage. Individual tabs are also worn as small metal arches above or below medals or ribbons on dress uniforms.

Tabs are valued uniquely in the U.S. Army because unlike medals - which are only worn on a soldier's garrison or dress uniform - tabs are worn on a soldier's combat uniform. Moreover, tabs are worn above a soldier's SSI which rarely include words as a part of their symbolism. It is unique in that it identifies an individual soldier's or a whole unit's special skill using words rather than images to symbolize a skill. For example, while any member of a special forces unit will wear the unit's SSI that includes an arrowhead, sword, lightning, and Airborne Tab, only soldiers who have completed special forces training will have been awarded and wear an additional tab containing the words "SPECIAL FORCES" (i.e. the Special Forces Tab) that is worn above the unit's Airborne Tab.

Some tabs are awarded to recognize an individual soldier's combat related skills or marksmanship and are worn by a soldier permanently. These tabs are also considered special skill badges and have metal equivalents that are worn on the soldier's chest of their Army dress uniforms. Other tabs recognize a whole unit's special skill and are considered to be part of a specific unit's SSI and are worn by a soldier only while they belong to that unit.  The Jungle and Arctic Tabs are unique in that while they are awarded to recognize an individual soldier's skill, it is only worn by soldiers while they belong to certain units. Similarly, tabs awarded at the state level by the Army National Guard can only be worn by soldiers while they are on state-level orders.

Individual tabs
There are currently four permanent individual skill/marksmanship tabs authorized for wear by the U.S. Army. Only three skill tabs may be worn at one time.  A soldier wearing three tabs is said to have achieved the "tower of power" in military slang.  Prior to the creation of the Sapper Tab, this required a soldier to earn both a Special Forces Tab and Ranger Tab as well as serve in a unit with an Airborne Tab or Mountain Tab as part of its SSI.

Special Forces

The Special Forces Tab is a service school qualification tab of the U.S. Army, awarded to any soldier completing either the Special Forces Qualification Course, or the Special Forces Detachment Officer Qualification Course. Soldiers who are awarded the Special Forces Tab are authorized to wear it for the remainder of their military careers, even when not serving in a Special Forces command. The Special Forces Tab can be revoked by the Chain of Command for significant violations of conduct considered contrary to the high standards expected of a Special Forces soldier (for example, DUI or other forms of misconduct).

The Special Forces Tab was created in 1983 and is an embroidered arch patch worn on the upper left sleeve of a military uniform.

Ranger

The Ranger Tab is a qualification tab authorized upon completion of the U.S. Army's Ranger School by a member of the U.S. military, civilian personnel, or non-U.S. military personnel. The Ranger Tab was approved by the Chief of Staff, Army, on 30 October 1950.

The subdued tab is identical, except the background is olive drab and the word "RANGER" is in black letters.

Sapper

The Sapper Tab is a qualification tab which is authorized for graduates of the U.S. Army's Sapper Leader Course. The Sapper Tab was approved by the Chief of Staff, Army, on 28 June 2004. The Sapper tab can be revoked by the Engineer Commanding Officer of Ft. Leonard Wood, MO for misconduct, or not upholding the standard as an Engineer. Any requests will be processed through USASC.

The woodland subdued tab is identical, except the background is olive drab and the word "SAPPER" is in black letters and the desert subdued tab has a khaki background with the word "SAPPER" in spice brown letters.

President's Hundred

The President's Hundred Tab is a marksmanship tab which is authorized for soldiers who qualify among the top 100 scoring competitors in the President's Match held annually at the National Rifle Matches at Camp Perry, Ohio. This is a permanent award which will stay with the individual; there is no annual requirement to maintain the President's Hundred Tab. Most competitors will compete each year to ensure that less qualified individuals do not receive the tab.

On 27 May 1958, the National Rifle Association requested the Deputy Chief of Staff for Personnel's approval of a tab for presentation to each member of the "President's Hundred." The NRA's plan was to award the cloth tab together with a metal tab during the 1958 National Matches. The cloth tab was of high level interest and approved for wear on the uniform on 3 March 1958.

Jungle

The Jungle Expert Badge was often worn by graduates of the Jungle Operations Training Center (JOTC) at Fort Sherman until the school became inactive in 1999. The badge was authorized for wear by soldiers assigned to U.S. Army South who graduate from JOTC but the badge was never recognized Army-wide.

In 2014, the JOTC was reopened in Hawaii and the Jungle Expert Badge was revitalized as a tab which is authorized for wear by soldiers who complete the course and are assigned to the U.S. Army Pacific area of responsibility. However, the revitalized tab now simply reads 'Jungle' instead of 'Jungle Expert'. Other graduates of the course receive the tab as a souvenir.

Governor's "#" (National Guard)

The Governor's Twenty Tab is a state-level National Guard award, created in 1968, that is awarded to the top 20 shooters in a state. However, award criteria vary from state-to-state. For example, within the Texas Military Forces, only eight guardsmen are presented this award for rifle, eight for pistol, two for sniper, and two for machine gun each year. Texas guardsmen compete against other Texas guardsmen who have already received the award; thus, there may be one or two new recipients of this award each year. As of July 2014, 14 states have authorized the awarding of the Governor's Twenty Tab.

In the Missouri National Guard and Arizona National Guard, the top twelve guardsman selected to represent their state at the Winston P. Wilson Rifle and Pistol Championships are awarded the Governor's Twelve Tab (for Missouri) or Governor's Dozen Tab (for Arizona).  These tabs are worn on the upper-left sleeve of the ACU below individual tabs and above unit and honor guard tabs.  The Missouri National Guard also awards a Governor's Twelve Ribbon that accompanies the tab which is worn on dress uniforms; any guardsman who earns the award more than once wear Hawthorn Cluster Devices on top of the ribbon.

In the Iowa National Guard, the top ten rifle and/or pistol shooters from the state's Army and Air Force guard units that compete at the Iowa Governor's 10 Shooting Competition are awarded the Governor's Ten ("X") Tab.  Prior to 2008, the Governor's Ten Tab was awarded to the top five pistol shooters and top five rifle shooters. Today, the rifle and pistol scores are combined so only the best 10 overall shooters earn the tab.

Because these awards are state-level awards, soldiers and airmen under Title 32 status (state control) are authorized to wear them; soldiers and airmen under Title 10 status (federal control) are not.

Ranger Challenge (Army ROTC)

The Ranger Challenge Tab is the only United States Department of the Army individual qualification tab awarded exclusively to Army Reserve Officers' Training Corps (ROTC) cadets.  This award is presented annually to cadets who compete in regional ROTC Ranger Challenge competitions.

Unit tabs
An SSI is an embroidered patch worn on uniforms of the United States Army that identifies the wearer's major formation. Unit tabs are an integral part of the SSI and are never worn separately. Soldiers are only authorized to wear the tab while assigned to the organization that prescribes wearing the SSI with the tab.

Airborne

The Airborne Tab is a part of the SSI of certain airborne and air assault units. Airborne and air assault forces are military units, usually light infantry, set up to be moved by aircraft and dropped into battle. Thus, they can be placed behind enemy lines and have an ability to deploy almost anywhere with little warning. The tab is worn immediately above and touching the SSI.

Mountain

The Mountain Tab is a part of the SSI of the 10th Mountain Division and the 86th Infantry Brigade Combat Team (Mountain) and worn informally by cadre of the Northern Warfare Training Center and the Army Mountain Warfare School. The 10th Mountain Division retains the Mountain Tab for historical purposes but is currently organized as a traditional light infantry division.

Although they do not wear the Mountain Tab, mountain warfare training is a basic component of the US Army's Ranger School and each US Army Special Forces Group maintain detachments that specialize in mountain warfare.

Arctic

The Arctic Tab was an individual skill tab earned by those who graduated from the Cold Weather Orientation Course or Cold Weather Leadership Course held at the Northern Warfare Training Center. The tab was authorized for wear on the Army Combat Uniform (ACU) and Army Service Uniform (ASU) by U.S. Army Pacific while assigned to any of its units while in its area of responsibility.  The Arctic Tab was originally designed as a rectangular bar worn below the SSI on the ACU.  In November 2019, the Arctic Tab was redesigned to resemble other U.S. Army skill tabs and worn above the SSI, below other skill tabs and above unit designation tabs.

On 25 April 2022, the G-1 of the U.S. Army authorized the wear of the Arctic Tab by soldiers assigned to organizations in Alaska as a temporary wear tab with specific SSIs, above any already designed unit tabs and below individual tabs.  In the authorization letter, Lieutenant General Gary Brito wrote, "The Arctic tab recognizes organizations in the Arctic region, which operate in extreme cold-weather, mountainous, and high-latitude environments and support the Arctic strategy."

Advisor

Members of the Security Force Assistance Command, wear a tab as part of their unit's SSI.  Early versions of the SSI incorporated a tab embroidered with the words "ADVISE - ASSIST." Shortly after, the SSI tab was changed to read "COMBAT ADVISOR". The command's official SSI was authorized in December 2017 and the tab was again changed to "ADVISOR" and is authorized for wear by all security force assistance units.

SETAF

The U.S. Army Southern European Task Force, Africa SSI incorporates a scroll style tab as part of the unit's SSI.  The maroon colored tab incorporates the letters "SETAF" representing the name of the unit and was originally approved by the U.S. Army's Institute of Heraldry in 1955.  The SETAF SSI tab was changed to the airborne tab in 2001 but was reverted to the SETAF tab in 2008.  As a result of the re-designation of the U.S. Army Africa/Southern European Task Force to the U.S. Army Southern European Task Force, Africa in 2021, the heraldry of the SETAF SSI and tab were updated to reflect this change.

Combined Division

On 29 December 2015, the U.S. Army approved the wear of a black tab by soldiers assigned to Headquarters, 2nd Infantry Division (ID). This black tab, worn immediately above the 2nd ID's SSI, is embroidered with white English and Korean letters spelling out the words "Combined Division." The tab is used to signify the joint nature of the new combined headquarters made up of units from the U.S. Army's 2nd ID and the Republic of Korea Army's (ROKA) 8th ID, established on 3 June 2015. The tab may only be worn by U.S. Army 2nd ID and ROKA 8th ID headquarters soldiers while serving within the geographical boundaries and territorial waters of the Republic of Korea. The Korean letters 연합사단 are pronounced [Yeon-hap-sa-dan].

Honor Guard

The Honor Guard Tab is a part of the SSI of the 3rd U.S. Infantry Regiment (The Old Guard) and other selected units with ceremonial duties. The tab had been worn by the Honor Guard Company of the 1st Battle Group, 3d Infantry (The Old Guard) since early 1950. It was officially approved for wear by the Deputy Chief of Staff for Personnel (DCSPER) on 14 October 1959. The subdued tab is identical, except the background is olive drab and the letters are black.

On 16 March 1965, the DCSPER approved a white tab with ultramarine blue lettering for wear by select Honor Guard units throughout the U.S. Army. Proposed designs were submitted on 26 March 1965 and the color reversed version of The Old Guard's tab was approved on 19 April 1965. A subdued tab is also authorized. Additionally, there are other select Army and Army National Guard units that have their own distinctive Honor Guard Tabs that are not defined in general Army uniform regulations, such as the United Nations Command Honor Guard that wear a red (or scarlet) tab with white letters on the left shoulder of their service dress uniform.

On 31 December 2012, the DCSPER approved another Honor Guard Tab for wear by select Army National Guard units. The new tab is an ultramarine blue embroidered tab with the inscription "ARNG HONOR GUARD" in gold  letters, edged with a  gold border.

Band

Similar to the Honor Guard Tab for select units, the Band Tab is worn by an Army band within a given unit. The exception to this is the U.S. Army Field Band Tab which is an integral part of that unit's SSI, just like the Mountain Tab worn by the 10th Mountain Division. Each Army unit that has a band can have its own unique Band Tab, designed by the Institute of Heraldry, and can only be worn with that unit's SSI. Once a band member leaves the band to join another element of the same unit, they can no longer wear the Band Tab but will continue to wear their unit's SSI. Subdued versions of each unit's Band Tab is authorized for wear with their unit's subdued SSI.

Obsolete tabs

Pershing

The Pershing Tab was worn as part of the SSI for units supporting the Pershing missile system. From 1970 to 1971 the 56th Artillery Brigade wore the SSI of the Seventh Army with the Pershing tab. In 1971 the 56th FA received their own SSI that included the Pershing tab, which continued through redesignation as the 56th Field Artillery Command in 1986. The 3rd Battalion, 9th Field Artillery Regiment wore the Pershing tab with the SSI of III Corps from 1971 to 1981, then with that of the 214th Field Artillery Brigade when it had a SSI created in 1981. The Pershing tab was discontinued with the deactivation of units following the elimination of the Pershing missile system in 1991.

Company–Level Ranger Scrolls

Prior to the consolidation of the 75th Ranger Regiment into its own unit, the U.S. Army had ranger companies assigned to various infantry divisions and above.  These ranger companies wore black berets with unique organizational beret flashes and the 75th Ranger Regiment Distinctive Unit Insignia.  Also these companies wore a unique back scroll with red outline and white lettering above their unit's SSI known as a "ranger scroll."  These "ranger scrolls" look similar to today's SSIs worn by the 75th Ranger Regiment and its battalions but incorporated the words "AIRBORNE" and "RANGER" stacked in the center flanked by their company designation on the left and their infantry unit designation on the right.  In 1985, these ranger companies were redesignated as long-range surveillance companies and in doing so were no longer ranger units but specialized airborne–qualified intelligence units, thus swapping their ranger scroll and black beret for an airborne tab and maroon beret.

Air Assault

In 1963, the 11th Air Assault Division (Test) was established—formed from reactivated elements of the 11th Airborne Division—to explore the theory and practicality of helicopter assault tactics, and was inactivated two years later when testing was completed and the 1st Cavalry Division (Airmobile) was formed.  Although this test unit wore the SSI of the 11th Airborne Division, they replaced their Airborne Tab with a unique Air Assault Tab in February 1963, believed to be the first and last approved Air Assault Tab in the U.S. Army.

Army Air Forces' Command Identification

With the expansion of the U.S. Army Air Forces (AAF) in World War II, the AAF SSI became one of the most widely worn shoulder insignias of the war.  Given the AAF SSI did not allow someone to determine which AAF command the wearer belonged, on 28 July 1945 the U.S. Army approved the use of Command Identification Tabs—also known as an arc—to help identify an AAF solder's command.  These Command Identification Tabs were worn above the AAF SSI as an arc that followed the curvature of the SSI and was embroidered with the name of the AAF command in the same blue and gold colors as the SSI.  The use of these Command Identification Tabs continued until the introduction of the U.S. Air Force blue uniform.

See also
 Duty tabs of the United States Air Force
 Badges of the United States Army

References

Awards and decorations of the United States Army
United States military badges
United States Army uniforms
Articles containing video clips
Pershing missile
United States military specialty insignia